Peeter All (1829–1898) was an Estonian fisherman, farmer, ship captain, shipowner, rescuer of mariners in distress, and salvage diver.

Early years 
Peeter All's parents, Ado and Marie, were peasants who lived on Saaremaa's Loona Manor. Saaremaa (known as Oesel in German), is Estonia's largest island (2,673km2) and has numerous small, rocky, low-lying islands off its western coast. The largest of these is called Vilsandi. When he was one year old, Baron Hoyningen-Huene sent the family to live on Loonalaid, a small (1km2.) uninhabited Baltic Sea island, so his father could look after the hay grown there that provided feed for the manor's livestock. The family survived primarily from fishing and farming. All grew up to be 210cm tall and left home by twenty years of age to become a seaman. During the Crimean War (1853–1856) he tried to run the Baltic Sea blockade with a cargo of salt from Sweden and his ship was seized. He was arrested by the British, his ship was burnt and he was jailed for three years.

Farming 
After being released from jail, he returned to Loonalaid and decided to plant potatoes not in the island's rocky soil but in the near-shore kelp beds. He found that these potatoes ripened much faster than conventionally planted ones because the sun's rays heated the shallow waters. Demand for these early season potatoes was strong and they commanded a premium price at market in Riga, Latvia, more than 100 km by sea. He eventually bought Loonalaid from the Baron, and employed about a half-dozen farmhands who, when not working in the fields or with the small number of cows and many sheep, helped with the salvaging operations.

Salvaging shipwrecks 
With his profits from selling potatoes he bought a diving helmet from Germany and began to salvage the numerous ships lying on the ocean floor that had been wrecked on the nearby shoals. It was rare for ships in the Baltic to carry precious cargo and All primarily salvaged coal, metals and antique porcelain, the sale of which helped him to move in social circles far above his standing. All found that upper classes in St. Petersburg, Russia were prepared to pay handsomely for porcelain that was over one hundred years old and he did very well for himself, becoming one of the wealthiest Estonians of the time. In 1880 he was the first Estonian to have his photograph taken, a colored ferrotype that is on display at the Estonian Maritime Museum in Tallinn.

Shipbuilding 
In 1859, in partnership with the Baron, All built the first ship launched on Saaremaa, a single masted, 32 ton, 15.7 m long sloop named “Adler” (Kotkas). By 1867 this vessel was registered only in All's name. In 1869 All built another vessel named “Richard”. In 1875, he built the two-masted schooner “Schnelle Rosalie”, the largest ship (78 tonnes) then built on Saaremaa. In 1890, he purchased the “Zintenhof”, a 20-meter-long steel-hulled steamship that he used for salvage and maritime rescue operations in Estonia, Sweden and Finland. He received some medals for his rescues of both seaman and ships. In 1861, at the christening of his first child, British captain Robert Davies, officer Greit Batschets and seaman William Poole were in attendance. All had rescued them earlier that day from a British barque, name unrecorded, that had been wrecked nearby.

Family 
In 1860, All married Elise Tihik and they had five children, three girls and two boys, most of whom grew up, married and continued their maritime life either on Loonalaid or the much larger nearby island of Vilsandi. Two of All's grandsons, from his two eldest daughters, were Peter Mender and Johann Kalmar and both became Master Mariners and moved to the Far East to find work. Mender worked for Standard Oil captaining tankers on China's Yangtze River and Kalmar worked for Möller & Co. captaining cargo ships out of Shanghai.

References 

1829 births
1898 deaths
People from Saaremaa Parish
People from the Governorate of Livonia
Fishers
Estonian farmers